The religion of Sikhism emerged in the context of medieval India, where many Hindus and Muslims of the Punjab region became Sikhs through conversion. The original Sikhs were thus all converts, with the first one being Bhai Mardana, a former Muslim.

This is a list of converts to Sikhism.
 Bhai Mardana, convert from Islam to Sikhism
Banda Singh Bahadur - Born into a Hindu family as Lachman Dev (later Madho Das Bairagi), after meeting with Guru Gobind Singh he became a Sikh warrior for the Khalsa Army. 
Rai Bular Bhatti, a Muslim Rajput noble of the Bhatti clan during the latter half of the 15th century who was inspired by the Sikh Guru Nanak and donated half of his land. 
Ryan Hurst - Hollywood actor who has chosen to be also known as Gobind Seva Singh.  He has acted in Sons of Anarchy, We Were Soldiers and The Walking Dead as well as others.
 Alexandra Aitken - actress and daughter of former British cabinet minister Jonathan Aitken.
 Vic Briggs - former blues musician, now Vikram Singh Khalsa; became the first non-subcontinental to perform kirtan at Harmandir Sahib
 Gurmukh Kaur Khalsa - yoga teacher; co-founder and director of the Golden Bridge Yoga Center in Los Angeles
 Vikram Kaur Khalsa - former model and actress, starred in several horror movies
 Max Arthur Macauliffe (1841–1913) - senior administrator of the British Raj who was posted in the Punjab; prolific scholar and author; converted to Sikhism in the 1860s
 Babaji Singh - credited with translating Guru Granth Sahib, the holy text of the Sikhs, into Spanish.
 Martin Singh - Nova Scotia pharmacist and businessman and candidate for the leadership of the New Democratic Party of Canada in 2012.
Muhammad Sadiq - Singer and politician who is a member of Parliament in Lok Sabha. Was born Muslim, but brought up Sikh as his father would sing religious music Kirtan in Gurdwaras. He considers himself Sikh as per an interview given to newslaundry.
Hazel Keech - Bollywood actress of British and Indian descent who has been in films such as Bodyguard. She took the name Gurbasant Kaur on marriage to Sikh cricket player Yuvraj Singh.
Tyler Atkins - Also known as Tera Singh, is an Australia film director and actor. Most recently known for his completed production on his debut feature film, Bosch & Rockit, which he wrote, directed, and produced. 
Alexander Gardner - American Sikh Soldier in Maharaja Ranjit Singh's army. Converted from Christianity.
Maharaja Duleep Singh - Converted from Christianity back to Sikhism in 1864.
Bhagat Singh - Indian Independence freedom fighter, who is claimed to have "reconverted" to Sikhism from Atheism before his execution in 1931. However, his reconversion is controversial and contested topic, amongst different sources and scholars.

See also
 List of converts to Buddhism
 List of converts to Islam
 List of converts to Hinduism
 List of converts to the Baháʼí Faith
 List of people by belief

References

 
Sikhism